Belionota sagittaria is a Jewel Beetle of the Buprestidae family.

Description

Distribution
This species occurs in Indonesia and Philippines.

References

 UNiversal Biological Indexer
 Biolib

External links
 Kaefer

Beetles of Asia
Buprestidae
Beetles described in 1829